Augusto Larrabure (17 February 1912 – 15 October 1995) was a Peruvian sports shooter. He competed in the 50 m rifle event at the 1948 Summer Olympics.

References

1912 births
1995 deaths
Peruvian male sport shooters
Olympic shooters of Peru
Shooters at the 1948 Summer Olympics
Place of birth missing
20th-century Peruvian people